Wayne Chrebet (born August 14, 1973) is a former American football wide receiver who played 11 seasons for the New York Jets of the National Football League from 1995 to 2005.

High school and college career 
Chrebet grew up in Garfield, New Jersey in heavily suburban Bergen County. He played high school football at Garfield High School.

After graduating from Garfield, Chrebet remained in the tri-state area, attending Hofstra University on Long Island. Chrebet enjoyed a very productive college football career.  Playing from 1991 to 1994, he set several school records, which include the single-game receiving yards record (245), touchdowns in a game (five), season (16) and career (31). A four-year letter-winner, he twice led Hofstra in receiving yards, and during his 1994 Senior season he became the first player in school history to amass 1,000 receiving yards in a single season.  He also etched his name in the NCAA Division I-AA record book by scoring five receiving touchdowns in a single game, tying a record held by NFL Hall of Famer Jerry Rice.

Hofstra has honored Chrebet for his outstanding college career.  He was inducted into the Hofstra University Athletic Hall of Fame in 2006 as part of its inaugural class, and his jersey #3 was retired.

NFL career 
Despite his collegiate success, Chrebet was not regarded as an NFL prospect. He secured a tryout for the Baltimore Stallions of Canadian Football League, but was cut after one day.

Chrebet's big break came when he was granted a walk-on opportunity with the NFL's New York Jets, who at the time trained at Hofstra's campus; the Jets were coached by Rich Kotite, a fellow New Yorker. His chances of remaining on the team were nothing short of infinitesimal. He entered training camp 11th of 11 on the Jets' wide receiver depth chart; in those days, NFL teams rarely carried more than five receivers into the season. One day, Chrebet was stopped and detained at the front gate on his first day of training camp by a security guard, who thought Chrebet was too small to be a real player. A Jets team official was summoned to verify he was an authorized walk-on and could enter the training complex. Based on his performance in training camp and the preseason, Chrebet managed to make the team's final 53-man roster, the first Hofstra alumnus to make an NFL team in three decades.

In a December 3, 1995, game versus the St. Louis Rams, Chrebet pulled in 8 receptions and broke several tackles on a scramble toward the goal line. On October 19, 1996 at Jacksonville, Chrebet hauled in 12 receptions for 162 yards with five third-down conversions. On September 24, 2000, after former Jets teammate Keyshawn Johnson claimed that comparing Chrebet to him was like "comparing a flashlight to a star," Chrebet caught an 18-yard TD pass from Curtis Martin with 52 seconds left to give the Jets a 21–17 victory against Johnson's team at the time (the Tampa Bay Buccaneers). After this, the New York media dubbed Chrebet "The Green Lantern."  His primary nickname, however, was "Mr. Third Down" because 379 of his 580 career receptions were third to first down conversions.  Wayne Chrebet became a sensation and was featured on cereal boxes, in addition to having his #80 jersey worn by the supporting character Michael in the 2003 Will Ferrell motion picture Elf.

Some consider Chrebet's best overall game as the October 10, 2004 contest with the Buffalo Bills in which he enjoyed a perfect game, catching all 8 passes sent his way from quarterback Chad Pennington in a 16–14 victory. Chrebet's career history was named one of the greatest rags-to-riches stories in the history of professional sports by Sports Illustrated later that year.

In a November 6, 2005 game against the San Diego Chargers, Chrebet sustained a serious concussion on a clean play. Despite being knocked unconscious for several minutes, Chrebet still made a third-down catch for a first down, symbolic of the type of plays he made throughout his career. He was placed on injured reserve, ending his season. After being told that he risked brain damage if he suffered another concussion, Chrebet announced his retirement on June 2, 2006. At the time of his retirement, his 580 receptions were the second-most in franchise history, behind only wide receiver Don Maynard (NY Titans / NY Jets). His 7,365 yards from scrimmage were fifth in franchise history at the time of his retirement.

During his career, he caught passes from 13 different players, played for several different head coaches, and worked for two different owners. Chrebet was formally honored by the New York Jets on "Wayne Chrebet Day" during halftime of the September 23, 2007 game against the Miami Dolphins.

Chrebet wore #80 for his entire 11-season career as a Jet.  The Jets have not reissued the number since he retired, and it is generally understood that no Jet will wear that number again in the foreseeable future. He was formally inducted into the New York Jets Ring of Honor during halftime of the Monday December 1, 2014 game against the Miami Dolphins.

NFL career statistics

Awards and honors 
 1995: Newsday's "Jet of the Year," as voted on by the paper's readers.
 1996: Awarded the Dennis Byrd Award for Most Inspirational Player as voted by his New York Jet teammates.
 1996: Hofstra University Young Alumni Award. The award was bestowed to alumni who, within 10 years of graduation, achieved significant accomplishments in professional life.
 1997: New York Jets "Unsung Hero Award"
 2000: Thurman Munson Award for his outstanding efforts on an off the field and in serving in the community
 2001: New York Jets Alumni Association's "Jets Player of the Year"
 2002: Inducted into the Hofstra University Athletic Hall of Fame.
 2005: Awarded the Ed Block Courage Award.
 2010: NFL Top 10: Undrafted Players #10.
 2014: Inducted into the New York Jets Ring of Honor.

After the NFL 
Chrebet now resides in Colts Neck Township, New Jersey. Chrebet has operated two restaurants on Long Island near his alma mater, Hofstra University. Initially a steakhouse called Chrebet's, it was later closed and reopened as a sports-themed bar/restaurant called "Social Sports Lounge and Kitchen."

In 2007, Chrebet stated that he still feels post-concussion symptoms as a result of the multiple concussions he suffered while playing in the NFL, including headaches, lethargy, and sensitivity to light and noise. Nonetheless, he stated in 2014 that he has no regrets about playing football, saying: "When you sign up, you expose yourself to these things. I knew the risks. I loved the contact. I miss that. But I had some high I got over getting a big hit or making a hit if I got somebody or they got me more. Would I play any other way than what I'm saying? No." Chrebet added that the NFL's newer concussion rules are "good for the game, but I couldn't play that way," and that despite the lasting effects of his playing days, "It was different back then. It's fun just how different it was."

The NFL Network recognized Wayne Chrebet's career in 2009 by including Chrebet in their Top 10 episode "Best Undrafted Players" at the number ten position.

Chrebet served as the "FCS Championship Game Ambassador" for the 2009 FCS Championship Game between Villanova and Montana.

On May 28, 2009 Chrebet joined Morgan Stanley as a financial advisor working out of the Red Bank, New Jersey office. In Fall 2012, Chrebet joined Barclays Capital as a financial advisor and Assistant Vice President working out of the Park Ave, New York City office.

On April 26, 2013 Chrebet was at Radio City Music Hall and formally announced the New York Jets 2nd round draft selection of quarterback Geno Smith during the 2013 NFL Draft.

Chrebet is routinely invited to attend Jets games as a guest of honor by owner Woody Johnson and also routinely serves as an ambassador on behalf of the New York Jets and National Football League via community service and public relations events. Chrebet was formally inducted into the New York Jets Ring of Honor December 1, 2014. Chrebet is represented by R. Totka of Athlete Promotions.

Chrebet is now involved in owning standardbred (harness) racehorses; a passion he's been involved in since 2003.

On July 1, 2015 Chrebet qualified for daily fantasy sports provider FanDuel's World Fantasy Baseball Championship hosted by Bo Jackson, which took place on August 22, 2015.

References

External links
Wayne Chrebet's Official Website

ESPN player information
ESPN article on concussion studies and Chrebet
Hofstra Athletic Hall of Fame

1973 births
Living people
Garfield High School (New Jersey) alumni
People from Garfield, New Jersey
People from Colts Neck Township, New Jersey
Sportspeople from Bergen County, New Jersey
American people of Ukrainian descent
American football wide receivers
Hofstra Pride football players
New York Jets players
Players of American football from New Jersey
Ed Block Courage Award recipients